Manuel Pedro Gomes (born November 14, 1993) better known as Manel Kape, is an Angolan mixed martial artist currently competing as a flyweight in the Ultimate Fighting Championship. A professional competitor since 2012, he has formerly competed for Cage Fighters, Knock Out Championship and Rizin Fighting Federation. He is the former Rizin Bantamweight Champion and the former Knock Out Championship Bantamweight champion. As of December 19, 2022, he is #9 in the UFC flyweight rankings.

Mixed martial arts career

Early career
Manel Kape had several boxing matches prior to beginning his mixed martial arts career, all of which occurred before his first MMA fight at the age of 14.

He made his professional debut at 17, fighting with Cage Fighters, at Cage Fighters 2, when he faced Artur Gomes. Kape won the bout in the first round by way of TKO. Fighting at Cage Fighters - Challengers Norte 1 he was scheduled to face Renato Ferreira. He made quick work of his opponent, ending the fight by TKO, after just 45 seconds. Next he fought Ricardo Teixeira, earning his first submission win, ending the fight in the first round with a rear naked choke. His last fight with Cage Fighters was at Cage Fighters 3, when he fought Marco Santos. He won the fight with a unanimous decision.

Moving to Knock Out Championship he fought Souksavanh Khampasath. He would suffer his first professional loss, losing through a rear naked choke. Recouping, he fought Hicham Rachid at Invictus 1, and won the fight with a flying knee to the body. He next fought at Ansgar Fighting League 2, against Daniel Barez. He beat Barez through a verbal tapout, forced by a tight armbar cinched by Kape. Returning to the second Invictus event, Kape faced Miguel Valverde. He won the fight with a rear naked choke in the first round. He was then scheduled to fight Antoine Gallinaro. Kape won the fight in the fourth round through an armbar, which earned him the KOC Bantamweight title. Kape continued his winning streak by beating Francisco Javier Asprilla by way of a third-round TKO.

Manel Kape was scheduled to fight Damien ‘The Rage’ Rooney at BAMMA 22 in the 3Arena in Dublin. Kape would later pull out of the bout. Kape was then set to fight against the Brazilian João Elias, but the fight would likewise be cancelled. Manel Kape was scheduled to fight at Knock Out Championship 9 against Moktar Benkaci for the KOC bantamweight championship. This would be the third consecutive fight that fizzled out for Manel Kape.

Rizin Fighting Federation
Following a two-year hiatus, due to the three canceled bouts, Kape would sign with Rizin Fighting Federation and was set to take part in the Rizin bantamweight Grand Prix. He made his debut at Rizin 6 when he faced Erson Yamamoto. Yamamoto was confused by Kape's trash-talk during the fight, as he allegedly said "[your] mom just lost and [you] are next", since Erson's mother had lost earlier in the evening. Kape would go on to win the fight after just 71 seconds with a left leg head kick KO, although the stoppage was considered early by many observers.

In the second round of the Grand Prix, Kape was scheduled to fight the former Tachi Palace flyweight champion Ian McCall. The two got into a physical altercation at the weigh-ins, with Kape slapping McCall and McCall responding with a strike to the face of Kape. The two had to be separated by the officials present. Kape would win the fight by TKO in the second minute of the first round, after the ringside doctors stopped the fight due to a cut.

In the Grand Prix semifinals he fought one of the world's best bantamweights in Kyoji Horiguchi. Although Kape gave his opponent a competitive fight, he would lose the bout in the third round, after Horiguchi locked in an arm triangle choke.

Manel Kape was scheduled to fight Kai Asakura Rizin 10. He would lose a split decision, in a close and exciting fight, which would be nominated as the Fight of the Month by MMA Junkie.

At Rizin 13 Manel was scheduled to face Yusaku Nakamura. Kape beat Nakamura with a rear naked choke at the end of the third round.

Kape's next fight was against Ulka Sasaki. Sasaki would win a comfortable unanimous decision combining good striking with a strong ground game to beat Kape.

Manel Kape was to fight the ZST flyweight champion Seiichiro Ito at Rizin 15. Kape defeated Ito with a strong left hook to the body, which gave him a KO win in the second round.

At Rizin 18 Manel Kape was scheduled to fight the 14 fight UFC veteran and former World Extreme Cagefighting bantamweight title challenger Takeya Mizugaki. Kape would earn a dominant second-round KO win, stunning Mizugaki with a powerful uppercut, before landing a right hook to the jaw of Mizugaki. Following the win, Kape called out the Rizin bantamweight champion Kyoji Horiguchi.

Kyoji Horiguchi would in the meantime vacate the belt due to a knee injury. Kape was scheduled to fight Kai Asakura in a rematch, this time with the vacant bantamweight title on the line. The fight was preceded with peculiar trash-talk, as Manel Kape tore a cardboard cutout of Kai Asakura, declaring "You are already dead", and proceeding to chew up the cardboard remains. During the fight itself, Asakura tried to make use of his reach to outfight, while Kape looked to blitz in and land strikes. He would find success in the second round, earning a TKO victory following a barrage of punches. This win would earn him a Fighter of the Year nomination for the Asian MMA awards.

Ultimate Fighting Championship
On the 30th of March 2020, Manel Kape announced that he had penned a four-fight deal with the Ultimate Fighting Championship.

Kape was expected to make his promotional debut against Rogério Bontorin on August 15, 2020 at UFC 252. The fight was later cancelled, as Bontorin suffered an ankle injury.

Kape was scheduled to fight Alexandre Pantoja December 19, 2020 at UFC Fight Night: Thompson vs. Neal. However, Pantoja pulled out of the fight in early December due to COVID-19 symptoms. Kape served as a potential replacement for the UFC Flyweight Championship bout between Deiveson Figueiredo and Brandon Moreno a week earlier at UFC 256. The pairing was rescheduled on February 6, 2021 at UFC Fight Night: Overeem vs. Volkov. Kape lost the fight via unanimous decision.

Kape faced Matheus Nicolau, as an replacement for Tagir Ulanbekov, on March 13, 2021 at UFC Fight Night: Edwards vs. Muhammad. He lost the fight via controversial split decision. 21 out of 21 media members scored the fight for Kape.

Kape faced Ode' Osbourne on August 7, 2021 at UFC 265. At the weigh-ins, Kape weighed in at 129 pounds, three pounds over the flyweight non-title fight limit. The bout proceeded at catchweight and Kape was fined 20% of his purse, which went to Osbourne.  He won the fight via knockout in round one after connecting with a flying knee and following it up with punches.

Kape faced Zhalgas Zhumagulov on December 4, 2021 at UFC on ESPN 31. He won the fight via technical knockout in round one.

Kape was scheduled to face Su Mudaerji on April 23, 2022 at UFC Fight Night 205. However, just three days before the event, Kape withdrew due to personal reasons and the bout was scrapped.

Kape was scheduled to face  Rogério Bontorin on June 11, 2022, at UFC 275. However, the bout was scrapped the day before the event due to Bontorin suffering kidney issues related to cutting weight.

Kape faced David Dvořák on December 17, 2022 at UFC Fight Night 216. He won the fight via unanimous decision.

Kape is scheduled to face Alex Perez  on March 25, 2023 at UFC on ESPN 43.

Championships and achievements

Mixed martial arts
Rizin Fighting Federation
RIZIN Bantamweight Championship (One time)
Knock Out Championship
KOC Bantamweight Championship (One time)

Personal life 

Kape is the first Portuguese-Angolan fighter to be signed with the Ultimate Fighting Championship.

Mixed martial arts record

|-
|Win
|align=center|18–6
|David Dvořák
|Decision (unanimous)
|UFC Fight Night: Cannonier vs. Strickland
| 
|align=center|3
|align=center|5:00
|Las Vegas, Nevada, United States
|
|-
|Win
|align=center|17–6
|Zhalgas Zhumagulov
|TKO (punches)
|UFC on ESPN: Font vs. Aldo 
|
|align=center|1
|align=center|4:02
|Las Vegas, Nevada, United States
|  
|-
|Win
|align=center|16–6
|Ode' Osbourne
|KO (flying knee and punches)
|UFC 265
|
|align=center|1
|align=center|4:44
|Houston, Texas, United States
| 
|-
|Loss
|align=center|15–6
|Matheus Nicolau
|Decision (split)
|UFC Fight Night: Edwards vs. Muhammad
|
|align=center|3
|align=center|5:00
|Las Vegas, Nevada, United States
|
|-
|Loss
|align=center|15–5
|Alexandre Pantoja
|Decision (unanimous)
|UFC Fight Night: Overeem vs. Volkov
|
|align=center|3
|align=center|5:00
|Las Vegas, Nevada, United States
|
|-
|Win
|align=center|15–4
|Kai Asakura
|TKO (punches)
|Rizin 20
|
|align=center|2
|align=center|0:38
|Saitama, Japan
|
|-
|Win
|align=center|14–4
|Takeya Mizugaki
|KO (punch)
|Rizin 18
|
|align=center|2
|align=center|1:36
|Nagoya, Japan
|
|-
|Win
|align=center|13–4
|Seiichiro Ito
|TKO (punch to the body)
|Rizin 15
|
|align=center|2
|align=center|3:59
|Yokohama, Japan
|
|-
|Loss
|align=center|12–4
|Ulka Sasaki
|Decision (unanimous)
|Rizin 14
|
|align=center|3
|align=center|5:00
|Saitama, Japan
|
|-
|Win
|align=center|12–3
|Yusaku Nakamura
|Technical Submission (rear-naked choke)
|Rizin 13
|
|align=center|3
|align=center|4:27
|Saitama, Japan
|
|-
|Loss
|align=center|11–3
|Kai Asakura
|Decision (split)
|Rizin 10
|
|align=center|3
|align=center|5:00
|Fukuoka, Japan
|
|-
|Loss
|align=center|11–2
|Kyoji Horiguchi
|Submission (arm-triangle choke)
|Rizin World Grand Prix 2017: Final Round
|
|align=center|3
|align=center|4:27
|Saitama, Japan
|
|-
|Win
|align=center|11–1
|Ian McCall
|TKO (doctor stoppage)
|Rizin World Grand Prix 2017: 2nd Round
|
|align=center|1
|align=center|1:46
|Saitama, Japan
|
|-
|Win
|align=center|10–1
|Erson Yamamoto
|TKO (head kick and punch)
|Rizin World Grand Prix 2017: Opening Round - Part 2
|
|align=center|1
|align=center|1:11
|Saitama, Japan
|
|-
|Win
|align=center|9–1
|Francisco Javier Asprilla
|TKO (punches)
|International Pro Combat 7
|
|align=center|3
|align=center|4:59
|Lisbon, Portugal
|
|-
|Win
|align=center|8–1
|Antoine Gallinaro
|Submission (armbar)
|Knock Out Championship 8
|
|align=center|4
|align=center|2:26
|Cognac, France
|
|-
|Win
|align=center|7–1
|Miguel Valverde
|Submission (rear-naked choke)
|Invictus Pro MMA League 2
|
|align=center|3
|align=center|N/A
|Porto, Portugal
|
|-
|Win
|align=center|6–1
|Daniel Barez
|Submission (verbal)
|Ansgar Fighting League 2
|
|align=center|1
|align=center|3:25
|Madrid, Spain
|
|-
|Win
|align=center|5–1
|Hicham Rachid
|KO (flying knee to the body)
|Invictus Pro MMA League 1
|
|align=center|1
|align=center|2:42
|Porto, Portugal
|
|-
|Loss
|align=center|4–1
|Souksavanh Khampasath
|Submission (rear-naked choke)
|Knock Out Championship 7
|
|align=center|3
|align=center|3:27
|Cognac, France
|
|-
|Win
|align=center|4–0
|Marco Santos
|Decision (unanimous)
|Cage Fighters 3
|
|align=center|3
|align=center|5:00
|Matosinhos, Portugal
|
|-
|Win
|align=center|3–0
|Ricardo Teixeira
|Submission (rear-naked choke)
|Cage Fighters: Challengers Norte 2
|
|align=center|1
|align=center|2:38
|Matosinhos, Portugal
|
|-
|Win
|align=center|2–0
|Renato Ferreira
|TKO (punches)
|Cage Fighters: Challengers Norte 1
|
|align=center|1
|align=center|0:45
|Matosinhos, Portugal
|
|-
|Win
|align=center|1–0
|Artur Gomes
|TKO (punches)
|Cage Fighters 2
|
|align=center|1
|align=center|4:27
|Matosinhos, Portugal
|
|-
|}

See also
List of current UFC fighters
List of male mixed martial artists

References

External links
 
 

Living people
1993 births
Angolan male mixed martial artists
Portuguese sportspeople of Angolan descent
Portuguese male mixed martial artists
Flyweight mixed martial artists
Mixed martial artists utilizing boxing
Mixed martial artists utilizing Brazilian jiu-jitsu
Angolan practitioners of Brazilian jiu-jitsu
Portuguese practitioners of Brazilian jiu-jitsu
People awarded a black belt in Brazilian jiu-jitsu
Ultimate Fighting Championship male fighters
Sportspeople from Luanda